Bodyguard is a 2003 South Korean television series starring Cha Seung-won, Lim Eun-kyung and Han Go-eun. It aired on KBS2 from July 5 to September 14, 2003 on Saturdays and Sundays at 19:50 for 22 episodes.

Plot
Since Kyung-tak was forced to resign from his military post due to the fault of his superior, he is jobless and tries to make a living helping out at his parents' restaurant. As luck would have it, while applying for a new job, he saves a client of Yoo-jin's, a bodyguard, which results in Kyung-tak becoming employed by the security firm where she works, which is run by Sung-soo. Kyung-tak's life is headed for further changes as Na-young moves into town with her grandmother and becomes friends with his younger sister Kyung-mi.

Cast
 Cha Seung-won as Hong Kyung-tak 
 Lim Eun-kyung as Na-young 
 Han Go-eun as Park Yoo-jin
 Song Il-kook as Han Sung-soo
 Lee Se-eun as Han Shin-ae, Sung-soo's younger sister
 Lee Won-jong as Bang Man-bok
 Baek Il-seob as Kyung-tak's father
 Park Jung-soo as Kyung-tak's mother
 Jang Se-jin as Choi Tae-sung
 Kim Young-ok as Na-young's maternal grandmother
 Yoon Yong-hyun as Yoo-sung
 Kim Young-joon as Se-joon
 Maya as Hong Kyung-mi, Kyung-tak's younger sister 
 Lee Joo-seok as Yoon-shik
 Shin Choong-shik as Sung-soo's father
 Hyun Bin as the stalker

Awards
2003 Grimae Awards
Best Actor: Cha Seung-won

2003 KBS Drama Awards
Top Excellence Award, Actor: Cha Seung-won 
Popularity Award: Cha Seung-won
Popularity Award: Han Go-eun
Best New Actress: Maya

References

External links
Bodyguard official KBS website 

Korean-language television shows
2003 South Korean television series debuts
2003 South Korean television series endings
Korean Broadcasting System television dramas
South Korean romantic comedy television series
South Korean action television series
Works about bodyguards